Kia is a Korean automobile manufacturer.

Kia or KIA may also refer to:

Geography
 Kia language, an Aboriginal Australian language also known as Giya
 Kia, Iran, a village in Mazandaran Province, Iran

People
 Gia people, an Aboriginal Australian people also known as Kia
 Kia Abdullah (born 1982), English author and journalist
 Kia Asamiya (born 1963), Japanese manga artist
 Kia Byers (born 1987), Canadian canoeist
 Kia Corthron (born 1961), American playwright, activist, and television writer
 Kia Drayton (born 1983), American model
 Kia Goodwin (born 1973), African-American actress
 Kia Joorabchian (born 1971), Iranian businessman and football investor
 Kia Luby (born 1989), Australian actress and singer
 Kia McNeill (born 1986), American football defender
 Kia Nurse (born 1996), Canadian women's basketball player
 Kia Pegg (born 2000), British actress
 Kia Shine (born 1980), American rapper and record producer
 Kia Silverbrook (born 1958), prolific inventor and entrepreneur
 Kia Stevens (born 1977), American professional wrestler
 Kia Vaughn (born 1987), professional women's basketball player
 Kia Zolgharnain (born 1965), soccer player for the Kansas City Comets
 Kirby Ian Andersen, "K.I.A.", cross-genre pop electronica producer from Toronto, Canada

Other uses
 KIA (comics), Killed in Action, a Marvel Comics supervillain
 Kia (magic), a concept in  magic
 Kia (Mortal Kombat), a minor character from the Mortal Kombat game series
 kia, the ISO 639 language code for the Kim language of southern Chad
 Kia Tigers, a Korean professional baseball team

Acronyms
 Kachin Independence Army, in Kachin State, Myanmar
 Khwarizmi International Award
 Killed in action, status for combatants that have been or were killed during combat action
 King's Indian Attack, a chess opening
 Knots indicated airspeed
 Kuwait Investment Authority

Airports
 Kabul International Airport, Afghanistan
 Kannur International Airport, India
 Kaohsiung International Airport, Taiwan
 Katowice International Airport, Poland
 Keflavík International Airport, Iceland
 Kelowna International Airport, Canada
 Kempegowda International Airport, India
 Kent International Airport, United Kingdom
 Khartoum International Airport, Sudan
 Kigali International Airport, Rwanda
 Kilimanjaro International Airport, Tanzania
 Kotoka International Airport, Ghana
 Kuching International Airport, Malaysia
 Kuwait International Airport
 Kaiapit Airport, Papua New Guinea; IATA code:KIA

See also
 Kea (disambiguation)
 Kya (disambiguation)